The Sado shrew (Sorex shinto sadonis) is a subspecies of mammal in the family Soricidae. It is endemic to Japan, and more specifically, the Japanese island of Sado. Although it is sometimes referred to as its own species, more recent scholarship identifies it as a subspecies of the Shinto shrew. However, there are significant morphological differences between the species.

References

Mammals of Japan
Endemic fauna of Japan
Sorex
Taxonomy articles created by Polbot